Bafutyphlus is a genus of ground beetles in the family Carabidae. This genus has a single species, Bafutyphlus tsacasi.

References

Trechinae
Monotypic Carabidae genera